In mathematics, the crank conjecture was a conjecture about the existence of the crank of a partition that separates partitions of a number congruent to 6 mod 11 into 11 equal classes.

References

Number theory
Conjectures that have been proved